Orthoperus atomus is a species of beetle in family Corylophidae. It is found in the Palearctic

References

Corylophidae
Beetles described in 1808